Neosticta is a genus of damselflies belonging to the family Isostictidae.
It is endemic to eastern Australia.
Species of Neosticta are medium-sized damselflies, with a dull brown or black colouring and pale markings.

Species 
The genus Neosticta includes the following species:

Neosticta canescens  
Neosticta fraseri  
Neosticta silvarum

References

Isostictidae
Zygoptera genera
Odonata of Australia
Endemic fauna of Australia
Taxa named by Robert John Tillyard
Insects described in 1913
Damselflies